Gilson is both an English and French surname and a given name. Notable people with the name include:

Surname:
Alf Gilson, English footballer
Étienne Gilson, French philosopher
Earl Gilson, American politician
François Gilson, Belgian comics writer
Franklin L. Gilson, American politician
Georges Gilson, French Catholic bishop
Jamie Gilson, American children's book author
Jerome Gilson, American trademark lawyer
Luther F. Gilson, American politician
Paul Gilson, Belgian composer
Tom Gilson, American actor
Tom Gilson (American football), American football player

Given name:
Gilson Lavis, former drummer for the band Squeeze
Gilson Lubin, Canadian comedian
Gilson Manuel Silva Alves, Cape Verdean footballer
Gilson Varela, Cape Verdean footballer

See also
 Gilson (disambiguation)
 Gilsinho (disambiguation)

English-language surnames
French-language surnames
Patronymic surnames
Surnames from given names